Falkirk F.C.
John Stewart Meechan was a Scottish professional footballer who played as a centre forward. He played in the Scottish Football League with St Mirren, and FalkirkF.C he also made two appearances in the English Football League for Burnley in the 1933–34 season.

References

Footballers from Falkirk
Scottish footballers
Association football forwards
St Mirren F.C. players
Burnley F.C. players
Scottish Football League players
English Football League players
Year of birth missing
Year of death missing